Thijs Ploegmakers  performing as Adaro, is a Dutch DJ and producer. In the past he produced several electronic music styles, for example in 2002 he was part of Driftwood (best known for their worldwide radio hit “Freeloader”). In 2008 he started producing hardstyle, and he is considered one of the originators of the raw hardstyle subgenre.

His breakthrough tracks were “The Haunter of the Dark" and “No Time To Sleep” plus he had a massive hit with his remix of “Chain Reaction – Answers”. In 2013 he was voted number 75 in the DJ Mag Top 100. Adaro released his music on A2 Records until 2014. In March, 2015, alongside Ran-D, B-Front and Frequencerz, Adaro is one of the founders of hardstyle record label "Roughstate".

Adaro has been responsible for creating many well-known Hardstyle songs that have reached certain commercial success, including "Touch A Star" with B-Front feat. Dawnfire, which was awarded #4 in the Q-dance Top 100 countdown for 2018. More Adaro hits include “I’m Alive” (official Rebirth Festival Anthem), “Strong” with Rejecta, his official Intents Festival anthem "Circus Of Insanity" with Digital Punk, his official remix for "Rellen in de Hel" by Dutch Hip-Hop artist EZG, “Walk with Me” with Vertile and his solo track “Flame up High”.

In 2020 Adaro did a remix of “Sefa – Calling” which was free released but gained large popularity within the hardstyle scene.

In addition to his solo releases, Adaro has collaborated with many artists within the hardstyle genre such as B-Front, Rejecta, Vertile, Hard Driver, Endymion, Digital Punk, Kronos, E-Force, MYST and Crypsis.

Adaro is also a half of the hardstyle act Gunz For Hire together with Ran-D, which was created in 2011. Gunz For Hire have released a discography of well-known Hardstyle hits, including "Bella Ciao," “Seek & Destroy”, "Bolivia," "Plata O Plomo," "No Mercy, “Kings of the Underground” and “Sorrow” among others.

Adaro has performed at some of the largest EDM and Hardstyle events such as Decibel Outdoor Festival, Defqon.1 Festival (Netherlands & Australia), Qlimax, Mysteryland, Q-BASE, Tomorrowland, Qapital, Reverze, EDC Las Vegas and many other events. Aside from being recognised as a leading Hardstyle DJ and producer in his home country The Netherlands, globally, Adaro is also recognised as he has gained bookings in many countries including The United States, Mexico, Chile, Australia, China, Czech Republic, Switzerland, Sweden, Norway, Scotland, Italy, France, Spain, Portugal, Bulgaria, Canada, Austria, Germany and Belgium.

Discography

References

External links 
 http://www.discogs.com/artist/331248-Adaro
 http://www.djadaro.com/
 http://partyflock.nl/artist/20432:Adaro
 http://a2records.nl/

1980 births
Living people
Dutch DJs
Hardstyle musicians
People from Landerd
Electronic dance music DJs